Giovanni Battista de Belli (27 March 1630 – September, 1693) was a Roman Catholic prelate who served as Bishop of Telese o Cerreto Sannita (1684–1693).

Biography
Giovanni Battista de Belli was born in Rodi, Italy on 27 March 1630. On 24 April 1684, he was appointed during the papacy of Pope Innocent XI as Bishop of Telese o Cerreto Sannita. On 1 May 1684, he was consecrated bishop by Alessandro Crescenzi (cardinal), Cardinal-Priest of Santa Prisca, with Francesco Maria Giannotti, Bishop of Segni, and Francesco Onofrio Hodierna, Bishop of Bitetto, serving as co-consecrators. He served as Bishop of Telese o Cerreto Sannita until his death in September 1693.

See also 
Catholic Church in Italy

References

External links and additional sources
 (Chronology of Bishops) 
 (Chronology of Bishops) 

17th-century Italian Roman Catholic bishops
Bishops appointed by Pope Innocent XI
1630 births
1693 deaths